"El Efecto" is a song recorded by Puerto Rican singers Rauw Alejandro and Chencho Corleone. It was written by Alejandro, Alejandro, Eric Duars, Colla, Mr. NaisGai, Nigel Hamelinck, Corleone, and Ravi Ramdihal, while the production was handled by Mr. NaisGai, Hamelinck, and Ramdihal. The song was released for digital download and streaming as a single by Duars Entertainment on March 15, 2019. A Spanish language reggaeton song, it is about living the moment since you never know what is going to happen tomorrow. The track received positive reviews from music critics, who complimented its danceable and catchy rhythm.

"El Efecto" was commercially successful, reaching the top 10 in Argentina and Dominican Republic. The song gained further recognition as Ester Expósito's video of dancing to the song went viral on Instagram. It has received several certifications, including platinum in Italy and double platinum in Spain. An accompanying music video, released simultaneously with the song, was filmed in Puerto Rico and directed by Abner Maldonado. A remix of "El Efecto" with Puerto Rican singer Kevvo featuring Puerto Rican rapper Bryant Myers, Puerto Rican singer Lyanno, and American singer Dalex was released on December 13, 2019. The remix received positive reviews from music critics and was ranked among the 100 best songs for a party by Cosmopolitan. It reached the top 20 in Paraguay, and was certified gold in Spain.

Background and release
On January 4, 2019, Rauw Alejandro shared a video of Chencho Corleone listening to a snippet of their collaboration, announcing its title as "El Efecto". Almost two months later, on March 6, Alejandro shared the artwork for the single on Twitter. Four days later, he confirmed that it would be released on March 15, 2019. The song was released for digital download and streaming by Duars Entertainment on the specified date, marking the first collaboration between Alejandro and Corleone.

An accompanying music video was released simultaneously with the song. The visual was directed by Abner Maldonado, produced by Ivan Joel, and filmed at Asere restaurant in Puerto Rico. Spanish actress and model Ester Expósito shared a video of herself, dancing to "El Efecto" on Instagram, that went viral and increased the popularity of the song. During an interview with Los 40, Alejandro revealed that he talks with Expósito via Instagram Direct and complimented her, saying: "She dances well, she is very talented." It was rumored that Alejandro and Expósito are dating, following the viral video and the compliments. However, Alejandro denied the rumors, stating: "What happens these days is that if they see you with a girl, they already start saying 'they're together' [...] Can't I have friends?"

Music and lyrics

Musically, "El Efecto" is a Spanish language reggaeton song, written by Alejandro, Alejandro, Eric Duars, Colla, Mr. NaisGai, Nigel Hamelinck, Corleone, and Ravi Ramdihal. Its production was handled by Mr. NaisGai, Hamelinck, and Ramdihal, and the track runs for a total of 3 minutes and 37 seconds. Lyrically, "El Efecto" which translates to "The Effect" in English, is about living the moment since you never know what is going to happen tomorrow. The lyrics include, "¿Quién sabe si mañana no te vuelvo a ver? / Vamo' a olvidarno' de lo correcto / Me quiero portar mal, te lo hago saber / La nota ya me hizo el efecto" (Who knows if I won't see you again tomorrow? / Let's forget of what is correct / I want to misbehave, I let you know / The note already had an effect on me).

Critical reception
"El Efecto" has been met with positive reviews from music critics. Happy FM staff gave the song a positive review, saying it "is one of those songs that instantly makes you want to dance". They described its rhythm as "catchy" and highlighted its melody and Alejandro's "own style" that makes the audience "unable to stop listening to it". In 2022, the staff listed "El Efecto" among Corleone's five collaborations with which the artist has made history, noting the singers' voices that "manage to blend perfectly". In the same year, Ernesto Lechner from Rolling Stone ranked the track as Alejandro's 19th-best song, praising "Chencho's manic delivery, juxtaposed with Rauw's laid-back charm". Writing for Billboard, Suzette Fernandez called the song a "hit", while an author of El Día labeled Alejandro "a key, original and different piece in today's music industry" in their review of the song.

Commercial performance
In Spain, "El Efecto" debuted at number 92 on May 5, 2019, becoming Alejandro's fourth and Corleone's first entry on the chart. The song originally peaked at number 48 in June 2019. However, following Expósito's viral video on Instagram, it re-entered the chart in April 2020 and reached a new peak of 32 on the chart issue dated May 31, 2020. The track was later certified double platinum by the Productores de Música de España (PROMUSICAE), for track-equivalent sales of over 80,000 units in the country. In Italy, the song debuted at number 55 on April 23, 2020, earning both Alejandro and Corleone their first entry. It subsequently peaked at number 22 and was certified platinum by the Federazione Industria Musicale Italiana (FIMI), for track-equivalent sales of over 70,000 units in the country. In Latin America, "El Efecto" reached the top 10 in Argentina and Dominican Republic, as well as the top 20 in Guatemala, Puerto Rico, and Uruguay. The song was also certified 4× platinum+gold by the Asociación Mexicana de Productores de Fonogramas y Videogramas (AMPROFON), for track-equivalent sales of over 270,000 units in Mexico. In the United States, it was certified 9× platinum (Latin) by the Recording Industry Association of America (RIAA), for track-equivalent sales of over 540,000 units.

Remix

On June 26, 2019, Alejandro teased a remix of "El Efecto" via a tweet on his Twitter account: "EL EFECTO REMIX 👀👀👀". On December 13, 2019, he released the remix version with Puerto Rican singer Kevvo featuring Puerto Rican rapper Bryant Myers, Puerto Rican singer Lyanno, and American singer Dalex. Kevvo, Myers, Lyanno, Dalex, and Pedro J. Figueroa joined the original version's lyricists to write the remix version. The version runs for a total of 4 minutes and 49 seconds. An accompanying lyric video was also released simultaneously with the song, which has received over 600 million views on YouTube.

Critical reception
Linda Yicela Hernández Sanchez from Colombia.com gave "El Efecto (Remix)" a positive review, naming the singers "some of the most exceptional talents of current urban music". She labeled the song "[a] unique collaboration", stating that it "promises to cause a great sensation" within Alejandro's audience, "not only because it is a powerful collaboration, but also because it follows the great success of the original version of it". In 2022, Cosmopolitan ranked it among the 100 best songs for a party.

Commercial performance
"El Efecto (Remix)" debuted at number 59 on Spain's official weekly chart on the chart issue dated April 26, 2020, becoming Alejandro's fifteenth entry, Corleone's fourth, Kevvo's first, Myers' eighth, Lyanno's fourth, and Dalex's eleventh. On May 31, 2020, the song reached its peak of number 49. The track was later certified gold by the Productores de Música de España (PROMUSICAE), for track-equivalent sales of over 20,000 units in the country.

In Latin America, the song peaked at number 15 in Paraguay, number 45 in Colombia, number 46 in Peru, and number 16 on Monitor Latino's Costa Rica Urbano. The song was also certified double platinum by the Asociación Mexicana de Productores de Fonogramas y Videogramas (AMPROFON), for track-equivalent sales of over 120,000 units in Mexico.

Track listings

Credits and personnel
Credits adapted from Spotify.
 Rauw Alejandro associated performer, composer, lyricist
 Chencho Corleone associated performer, composer, lyricist
 Eric Pérez composer, lyricist
 José M. Collazo composer, lyricist
 Mr. NaisGai composer, lyricist, producer
 Nigel Hamelinck composer, lyricist, producer
 Ravi Ramdihal composer, lyricist, producer
 Kevvo associated performer, composer, lyricist for the remix version
 Bryant Myers associated performer, composer, lyricist for the remix version
 Lyanno associated performer, composer, lyricist for the remix version
 Dalex associated performer, composer, lyricist for the remix version
 Pedro J. Figueroa composer, lyricist for the remix version

Charts

Weekly charts

Monthly charts

Year-end charts

Certifications

Release history

See also
 List of Billboard Argentina Hot 100 top-ten singles in 2020

Footnotes

References

2019 songs
2019 singles
Rauw Alejandro songs
Chencho Corleone songs
Songs written by Rauw Alejandro
Spanish-language songs